Celtic Thunder: Storm is the title of both a CD album and DVD that was released on 20 September 2011 by the musical group Celtic Thunder. This article relates mostly to the DVD, which is worthy of mention because unlike Celtic Thunder's other DVDs, which are filmed versions of their touring concerts, Storm is a full theatrical production.

Storm contains no spoken lines. Its story is told solely through its sixteen songs, most of which were written for the show by Phil Coulter, and the movements of its performers. One prerecorded video segment, for the song "Stand and Deliver", is shown on the back wall of the stage to depict the events described in the song, which would be difficult to stage live.

As with Celtic Thunder's other filmed events, Storm has aired on PBS in a slightly edited form. The order of the songs in Celtic Thunder's concerts is often different from the DVD to the PBS special, but this would ruin the storyline of Storm, and thus the PBS special is almost identical to the DVD (see Notes).

Cast
Named roles: 
 George Donaldson: The Head Villager
 Ryan Kelly: The Traveller Leader
 Keith Harkin: The Highwayman
 Damian McGinty: The Young Buck
 Deirdre Shannon: The Gentlewoman
 Paul Byrom: The Landowner's Son
 Ruth O'Leary (violin): The Chief's Daughter
 Caroline Torti (dancer): The Traveller Leader's Sister (voice of Charley Bird)

Other roles within the production are played by members of Celtic Thunder's band and by the dancers who also appear on their DVD It's Entertainment, which was filmed concurrently with Storm.

Villagers: 
 Neil Byrne (vocals/guitar)
 Dave Cooke (keyboard)
 Nicole Hudson (viola)
 Conor McCreanor (bass)
 Brendan Monaghan (pipes, whistle)
 Hayley-Jo Murphy (dancer)
 Joyce O'Leary (violin)
 Julianne Reilly (dancer) 
 Megan Sherwood (cello)

Travellers: 
 Stephan Dickson (dancer)
 Taylor James (dancer)
 Ethan LaFleur (dancer)
 Adam Lopapa (dancer)
 Justin Lopez (dancer)
 Declan O'Donoghue (percussion)
 Anthony Stuart (percussion)
 Cody Szarko (dancer)

Story
A storm breaks over a tiny village, inciting a caravan of mischievous Travellers to enter the village square and wreak havoc ("Storm Overture"). One of the village girls (Julianne Reilly) awakens and runs into the Traveller Leader, who holds her for a moment then releases her to return to her cottage. The Travellers discover that a chest in the village square contains gold and fine fabrics, and are exulting over this find when the men of the village arrive and chase them away.

The villagers tidy up the mess the Travellers have left behind and thank God for the arrival of morning, as do the Travellers, who have camped across the stream from the village ("New Day Dawning"). Both sides swear that they will fight to defend their homes.

The Traveller Leader waits for nightfall, then daringly runs through the village, stating that he does not care about being on the outskirts of society because he finds their games amusing to watch ("Outside Lookin' In"). Among his exploits is robbing the chest again, this time from under the nose of the sleeping Young Buck. He returns to the bridge across the stream at the advent of the Highwayman and gives the piece of jewelry he has stolen to his Sister, who accepts it eagerly and joins in her brother's song, agreeing with him, but watches the Highwayman nonetheless.

The Young Buck, scolded by the Highwayman for sleeping when he was supposed to be guarding the chest of valuables, claims angrily that he should be considered a man instead of a boy because of his age ("When You Are 18"), although his actions are still those of a child.

The Head Villager, discovering several of the men of the village sitting idle with the Highwayman, feels the need to make his authority clear ("Life in the Old Dog Yet"), which includes laying out his plan to marry his Daughter to the Landowner's Son. Although she dutifully dances with the man her father prefers, she flirts openly with one of the other villagers (Neil Byrne), hinting that her affections may be otherwise given.

Alone, the Landowner's Son explains that though the Head Villager's Daughter is certainly beautiful and desirable, he does not love her and believes that the perfect woman for him exists somewhere else ("Not the One").

The Highwayman gives details on how the items in his chest were obtained ("Stand and Deliver"), illustrated by the video shown on the back wall of the stage which depicts him robbing a carriage containing a well-dressed man and woman. As the Highwayman rides away and the man speaks angrily with his coachman, the woman gets out of the carriage and runs off, following the Highwayman.

A few moments later, the Gentlewoman arrives on stage in person, dressed in the same gown in which she was shown in the video and wondering aloud about the strange man who took her jewels ("The Highwayman"). She discovers him washing his hands in the stream and begins to approach him, but sees that he is fascinated by the Traveller Leader's Sister, who appears across the stream. Defeated, she retires from the lists.

The Head Villager, the villager who loves his Daughter, the Landowner's Son, and the Young Buck sing a traditional ballad about loving a woman, musing on their various lost, unattainable, or not yet discovered loves ("My Lagan Love").

Across the stream, the Traveller Leader tells the story of a village girl who ran off with a "gypsy" and was never seen again ("Midnight Well"), simultaneously seducing the girl who discovered the Travellers during the Overture. The Traveller Leader's Sister, not to be outdone, begins to seduce the Highwayman ("Shadows Dancing"), but they are discovered by her brother and run away hand in hand.

The Gentlewoman reappears, dressed in white, to sing in Irish about the futility of war and violence ("Harry's Game"). The Landowner's Son discovers her, recognizes her as his perfect woman, and woos her in song, to which she responds favorably ("Tender is the Night").

Accepting the defeat of his plan for his Daughter's marriage (and hinting that he will no longer stand in the way of her marrying the man she wants), the Head Villager reflects philosophically on everything which has made him the man he is ("This Was My Life").

The Young Buck reappears and begins to meddle with the Highwayman's belongings, to which the Highwayman objects, and the two sing a duet ("Look at Me") in which the Young Buck claims that he is "a natural winner", "a hell of a fella", and irresistible to women. The Highwayman points out that the women of the village, gathered behind them, are in fact laughing at the Young Buck, who does not take kindly to the realization.

The Traveller Leader leads his tribe openly into the village, and the village men assemble to defend their home ("Hail the Hero (Mo Ghile Mear)"). Though they are evenly matched in numbers, there is no telling what will happen when the fight begins...

Track listing

Notes 
 The Highwayman's style of dress, such as his ruffled shirt and the tricorne hat seen in the video during "Stand and Deliver", supports the claim in the song "The Highwayman" that he is "a nobleman who has gone wrong", as well as helping to date the setting of the show to the late 18th century.
 The village women notice the Gentlewoman and begin to whisper about her as she sings "The Highwayman", which may explain both where she goes after the song ends and her change of costume when she reappears.
 In the final moments of "Hail the Hero (Mo Ghile Mear)", when the Travellers and the villagers square off one-on-one, the Traveller Leader faces the Highwayman, hinting that he has come to defend his Sister's honor. Dave Cooke does not appear onstage in this song, placing the number of villagers and Travellers at seven apiece.
 Though most of the members of Celtic Thunder's band are dressed as and act the part of villagers, the two percussionists, Declan O'Donoghue and Anthony Stuart, wear Traveller garb; they do not take part in the action but are visible at their drums, which are set up onstage on the other side of the Traveller camp from the village, throughout the show.
 The lyrics sung by a woman's voice over the opening credits of Storm are "A Thiarna dean trocaire, A Chriost dean trocaire", which are Irish Gaelic for "Lord have mercy, Christ have mercy" and from the chorus of Celtic Thunder's usual opening song for their concerts, "Heartland".
 The PBS special of Storm omits "Not the One" and has a different, less suggestive, ending pose for the Traveller Leader and the village girl in "Midnight Well".
 A number of relationship parallels arise between Storm and It's Entertainment:
 Keith Harkin and Caroline Torti were depicted as a couple in It's Entertainment, in which the song "Just Like Jesse James", also sung by Charley Bird, was staged as an angry challenge to him, followed by his "Hard to Say I'm Sorry" which showed their reconciliation.
 Julianne Reilly was the female dancer in both Ryan Kelly's solo numbers in It's Entertainment, notably portraying the "girl named Doris" in "Bad, Bad Leroy Brown". The male dancers from this song play Storm'''s Traveller people to Ryan's Traveller Leader.
 The third female dancer from It's Entertainment, Hayley-Jo Murphy (daughter of Celtic Thunder choreographer Belinda Murphy), also makes an appearance in Storm, but her role as Damian McGinty's love interest is not reprised. She wears a less revealing costume than the rest of the female cast, in deference to her age.

External links
 Celtic Thunder's official Storm press release: https://web.archive.org/web/20110905032547/http://cms.celticthunder.ie/node/835746
 Celtic Thunder's official lyrics site, including the songs from Storm'': https://web.archive.org/web/20111002015452/http://cms.celticthunder.ie/lyrics

2011 albums
Celtic Thunder albums